Maslandapur (also spelled as Machhlandapur) is a census town in the Habra I CD block in Barasat sadar subdivision in North 24 Parganas district in the Indian state of West Bengal.

Geography

Location

Maslandapur, Nokpul, Sadpur and Betpuli form a cluster of census towns, south of Gobardanga. The Jamuna separates Gobardanga from this cluster. Habra police station serves this area.

PIN Code of Maslandapur is 743289.

Area overview
The area covered in the map alongside is largely a part of the north Bidyadhari Plain. located in the lower Ganges Delta. The country is flat. It is a little raised above flood level and the highest ground borders the river channels.54.67% of the people of the densely populated area lives in the urban areas and 45.33% lives in the rural  areas.

Note: The map alongside presents some of the notable locations in the subdivision. All places marked in the map are linked in the larger full screen map.

Demographics
According to the 2011 Census of India, Machhlandapurr had a total population of 10,790, of which 5,519 (51%) were males and 5,271 (49%) were females. Population in the age range 0-6 years was 879. The total number of literate persons in Machhlandapurr was 8,708 (85.58% of the population over 6 years).

 India census, Machhlandapurr had a population of 9,706. Males constitute 51% of the population and females 49%. Machhlandapurr has an average literacy rate of 78%, higher than the national average of 59.5%: male literacy is 84%, and female literacy is 72%. In Machhlandapurr, 9% of the population is under 6 years of age.

Economy

Commuters
As per 2011 census, a large proportion of people in Habra I CD block earn their livelihood as ‘other workers’, which include office, factory and transport workers, professionals and business people and so on. (See Habra I for details). Around a total of 32 lakh people from all around the city commute to Kolkata daily for work. In the Sealdah-Bangaon section there are 58 trains that carry commuters from 24 railway stations. In the Seadah-Hasnabad sections 32 trains carry commuters from 30 stations.

Infrastructure
As per District Census Handbook 2011, Maslandapur covered an area of 1.7 km2. It had 3 primary schools, 1 middle school, 1 secondary school and 1 senior secondary school.

Banks
State Bank of India, UCO Bank, Bandhan Bank, United Bank of India and Axis Bank have their branches here. A few ATMs are also situated here.

Transport
Maslandapur is situated beside State Highway 3.

Machhalandapur railway station is on the Sealdah-Bangaon branch line. It is 53.5 km far away from Sealdah and is part of the Kolkata Suburban Railway system.

Education
Maslandapur Bhudeb Smriti Balika Vidyalaya is a higher secondary school for girls in Maslandapur. Rajballavpur High School and Dhakshin Chatra High School are higher secondary schools for boys in Maslandapur.

Bandhan Academy is a Primary School for Girls and Boys from middle and low income families aiming to provide life centric quality education. Low cost education for the benefit of poor communities. Promoted by Bandhan a voluntary not for profit organization in West Bengal.

Gobardanga Hindu College at Gobardanga and Sree Chaitanya Mahavidyalaya at Habra are located nearby.

Healthcare
Maslandapur Rural Hospital with 30 beds functions as the main medical facility in Habra I CD block.

North 24 Parganas district has been identified as one of the areas where ground water is affected by arsenic contamination.

Notable persons
 Antara Mitra, Indian Playback Singer

See also
 Map of Habra I CD Block on Page 289 of District Census Handbook.

References

Cities and towns in North 24 Parganas district